Rufio was an officer of the Roman general and statesman Julius Caesar. In 47 BC he was appointed by Caesar as commander-in-chief of the three Roman legions that were stationed in Egypt.

Rufio was the son of a freedman and came in 48 BC as a member of Caesar's army to Egypt. After Caesar intervened in the Ptolemaic struggle for the throne between the siblings Cleopatra and Ptolemy XIII and won the Alexandrian war against Ptolemy XIII and his allies (January 47 BC), he stationed three legions in Egypt to safeguard his victory. These troops of the 27th, 37th, and 39th legion served to protect but also keep in check the rule of Cleopatra, who had become Caesar's mistress and now reigned as allied queen.

Contrary to tradition, Caesar did not appoint a senator as supreme commander of the Roman occupying army but his reliable officer Rufio. The main reason for this nomination was that Caesar feared that an influential senator, left behind in Egypt as commander-in-chief, could use the economically strong and strategically important land on the Nile as a base to make a bid for power, whereas Rufio had too low a rank and did not possess the necessary connections. Caesar also seems to have considered his officer very trustworthy because Suetonius calls Rufio a lover (exoletus) of Caesar.

Cultural references 

 Rufio appears as the main antagonist of The Hidden Ones, an expansion for the 2017 video game Assassin's Creed Origins. His full name is given as Gaius Julius Rufio (possibly to highlight his close relationship to Caesar) and, like Caesar, he is depicted as a member of the fictitious Order of the Ancients, a precursor organization to the Templar Order. In an effort to reduce the Romans' control over the Sinai Peninsula, the protagonist Bayek assassinates Rufio's lieutenants to draw him out of hiding, before killing Rufio himself once he comes to Sinai in 38 BC.
 Rufio appears in the 1999 two-part miniseries Cleopatra, in which he was portrayed by John Bowe.
 Rufio also appears in the 1963 film Cleopatra, in which he was portrayed by Martin Landau.
 In the 1945 film Caesar and Cleopatra directed by Gabriel Pascal and based on the play by George Bernard Shaw, Rufio is played by Basil Sidney.

Notes

References 
 Michael Grant: Cleopatra, 1972, Rev. ed. 1974, German Bergisch Gladbach 1998, pp. 113–114; 116–117.
 Friedrich Münzer: Rufio 3. In: Realencyclopädie der Classischen Altertumswissenschaft, vol. I A,1, Stuttgart 1914, col. 1198.
 Christoph Schäfer: Kleopatra, Darmstadt 2006, pp. 80–81 with note 105.

Ancient Roman generals
1st-century BC Romans
1st-century BC births
Year of death unknown
Military personnel of Julius Caesar